Eschweilera compressa is a species of woody plant in the family Lecythidaceae. It is found only in Brazil and is threatened by habitat loss.

References

compressa
Flora of Brazil
Critically endangered plants
Taxonomy articles created by Polbot